Lieutenant Colonel Kwame Barney Agbo is a Ghanaian soldier and politician. He was a member of the National Redemption Council (NRC) which overthrew the government of Kofi Abrefa Busia on 13 January 1972.

Military career
The last position Agbo held in the Ghana Armed Forces before getting involved with politics was as Second in Command of the First Infantry Battalion of the Ghana Army based at Tema with the rank of Major.

Politics
The leader and Head of State after the 13 January 1972 coup d'état was then Colonel Kutu Acheampong. The people he is reputed to have trusted with plans for the coup include Major Agbo, Major Kwame Baah who was the Second in Command of the Fifth Infantry Battalion in Accra and Major Anthony Selormey who was the Second in Command of the Armoured Reconnaissance Squadron in Accra. He became one of the members of the NRC.
He initially served as the Commissioner for Industry but was later appointed the Commissioner for Labour, Social Welfare and Co-operatives by Kutu Acheampong until the NRC was superseded by the Supreme Military Council (SMC) on 9 October 1975. The formation of the SMC removed Agbo, Selormey and Baah from the executive council of government. He was appointed the Commissioner for Local Government. Agbo felt that the three of them had been shortchanged by Kutu Acheampong and opted to resign from government shortly afterwards.

See also
National Redemption Council
Supreme Military Council, Ghana

References

External links
Ghana: Exhibition Of Ghana Made Goods. 1972 – Agbo speaking at 00:00:14
Ghana Manufacturing Achievement Exhibition | Acheampong Military Regime | Major K.B. Agbo | Jan 1973
Agbo speaking at a Ghana Workship on Strategies for Acricultural Co-Operatives Opens In Accra. 1974

Year of birth missing (living people)
Living people
Ghana Army personnel
Labour ministers of Ghana
Local government ministers of Ghana
Industry ministers of Ghana
Ewe people
People from Volta Region